The 6th award ceremony of the Feroz Awards was held at the Bilbao Arena, in Bilbao, on January 19, 2019. The ceremony was hosted by Ingrid García-Jonsson and was streamed live via YouTube.

Winners and nominees
Nominations were announced on 4 December 2018 in Madrid by María Guerra, Javier Ambrossi and Javier Calvo.

Film

Television

Feroz de Honor
José Luis Cuerda

See also
33rd Goya Awards

References

Feroz Awards
2019 in Spanish television
January 2019 events in Spain
Bilbao